The third season of The Real Housewives of Melbourne, an Australian reality television series, was broadcast on Arena. It aired from 21 February 2016, until 15 May 2016, and was primarily filmed in Melbourne, Victoria. Its executive producers are Kylie Washington and Lisa Potasz.

The Real Housewives of Melbourne focuses on the lives of Jackie Gillies, Chyka Keebaugh, Gina Liano, Janet Roach, Lydia Schiavello, Pettifleur Berenger, Gamble Breaux, and Susie McLean; It consisted of twelve episodes.

Production and crew

It was announced on 7 June 2015 that the series would returning for its third installment with cast member Gina Liano announcing her return and that filming for the season would begin in July 2015.
On September 11, 2015, the cast of season three was announced as well as an order of a total of ten episodes, and on 22 December 2016 the premiere date was announced along with an increased episode order now with a total of eleven episodes.
On February 6, 2016, Arena released an official trailer featuring footage of season three.
Prior to the conclusion of the season, on 24 March 2016, it was announced the season would feature a reunion special.
The reunion special was filmed on 3 April 2016.

The series premiere "Join The Club" was aired on 21 February 2016,
while the eleventh episode "Waterfront" served as the season finale, and was aired on 1 May 2016.
It was followed by a one-part reunion which marked the conclusion of the season and was broadcast on 15 May 2016.

Kylie Washington and Lisa Potasz are recognized as the series' executive producers, and Euan Jones, Virginia Hodgson, Philippa Rubira are recognized as series' producers. It is produced by Matchbox Pictures, and distributed by NBCUniversal International Television Production.

Cast and synopsis
Although cast members Pettifleur Berenger and Lydia Schiavello returned for the third season of The Real Housewives of Melbourne, it was revealed after the conclusion of the third season by cast member, Roach and Chyka Keebaugh, that the two weren't initially set to return to the series.

The third season saw the introduction of a new wife, Susie McLean.
McLean as a country born resident in Toorak who is described as resilient and open-hearted. Mclean joins the series having known Schiavello for thirty-years, Chyka Keebaugh for twenty-years, and Gina Liano for ten-years. Her country upbringing has instilled traditional values and good manners into McLean, as well as being very close to her large Italian family. With the values instilled, McLean aspired to open her own finishing school. McLean  is a single, divorced mother of two boys, Monty, 19, and Rupert, 17. Having gone through two marriages, one to Rod Butterss that was highly publicised, McLean is embracing the single life. McLean devotes her time to being the current President of the Country Women's Association, in the Toorak branch. Away from raising her teenage boys and Country Women's Association, McLean spends her time to her passion of baking as well as her love of sport, which includes running, golf, skiing, boxing, horse-riding, wake-boarding and classical ballet.

Reception

U.S. ratings
The Real Housewives of Melbourne returned to Bravo for its third season on 22 July 2016, this time airing prime-time on Friday, compared to season two which aired prime-time Sundays.

Awards
In 2016, The Real Housewives of Melbourne season three was nominated for Reality Series Production in the Screen Producers Australia Awards, however the series was beaten by I’m A Celebrity Get Me Out Of Here! and The Great Australian Bake Off, who tied as winners.''.

Taglines
Chyka: "Honesty and integrity are my favourite accessories."
Gamble: "I may run with the wolf pack but I tread my own path."
Gina: "Persistence is king and I'm the queen of it."
Jackie: "When you know who you are, you have nothing to prove."
Janet: "I'm not everyone's drink of choice, but I'm my cup of tea."
Lydia: "Yes I'm a flirt but home is where my heart is."
Pettifleur: "I'm in the best shape of my life, who begs to differ?"
Susie: "If you can't stand the heat, get out of my kitchen."

Episodes

Home media release
The third season was released on DVD in region 4 on 16 November 2016.

References

External links

 
 
 

The Real Housewives of Melbourne
2016 Australian television seasons